Khulisma is a rural locality (a selo) in Laksky District, Republic of Dagestan, Russia. The population was 312 as of 2010.

Geography 
Khulisma is located 13 km southwest of Kumukh (the district's administrative centre) by road, on the Artsalinekh River. Khurkhi and Burshi are the nearest rural localities.

Nationalities 
Laks live there.

Famous residents 
 Musa Abacharayev (Doctor of Technical Sciences)
 Said-Omari Kallayev (Doctor of Physical and Mathematical Sciences)
 Malik Gafurov (Doctor of Physical and Mathematical Sciences)
 Azha Gaydarova (Doctor of Medical Sciences)
 Islam Makhachev (UFC fighter)

References 

Rural localities in Laksky District